Kathleen Hylda Valerie Booth ( Britten, 9 July 1922 – 29 September 2022) was a British computer scientist and mathematician who wrote the first assembly language and designed the assembler and autocode for the first computer systems at Birkbeck College, University of London. She helped design three different machines including the ARC (Automatic Relay Calculator), SEC (Simple Electronic Computer), and APE(X)C.

Early life and education
Kathleen Britten was born in Stourbridge, Worcestershire, England, on 9 July 1922. She obtained a BSc in mathematics from the University of London in 1944 and went on to get a PhD in Applied Mathematics in 1950. She married her colleague Andrew Donald Booth in 1950 and had two children.

Career
Kathleen Booth worked at Birkbeck College, 1946–62. She travelled to the United States as Andrew Booth's research assistant in 1947, visiting with John von Neumann at Princeton. While at Princeton, she co-authored "General Considerations in the Design of an All Purpose Electronic Digital Computer,"   describing modifications to the original ARC redesign to the ARC2 using a von Neumann architecture. Part of her contribution was the ARC assembly language. She also built and maintained ARC components.

Kathleen and Andrew Booth's team at Birkbeck were considered the smallest of the early British computer groups. From 1947 to 1953, they produced three machines: ARC (Automatic Relay Computer) built with Xenia Sweeting, SEC (Simple Electronic Computer), and APE(X)C (All-purpose Electronic (Rayon) Computer). She and Mr. Booth worked on the same team.  This was considered a remarkable achievement due to the size of the group and the limited funds at its disposal. Although APE(X)C eventually led to the HEC series manufactured by the British Tabulating Machine Company, the small scale of the Birkbeck group did not place it in the front rank of British computer activity.

Booth regularly published papers concerning her work on the ARC and APE(X)C systems and co-wrote "Automatic Digital Calculators" (1953) which illustrated the 'Planning and Coding' programming style. In 1957, She, her husband, and J.C. Jennings co-founded Birkbeck College's Department of Numerical Automation, now the School of Computer Science and Information Systems, in 1957. In 1958, she taught a programming course.

In 1958, Booth wrote one of the first books describing how to program APE(X)C computers.

From 1944 she was a Junior Scientific Officer at the Royal Aircraft Establishment in Farnborough. From 1946 to 1962, Booth was a Research Scientist at British Rubber Producers' Research Association and for ten years from 1952 to 1962 she was Research Fellow and Lecturer at Birkbeck College, University of London.

Booth's research on neural networks led to successful programs simulating ways in which animals recognise patterns and characters. She and her husband resigned suddenly from Birkbeck College in 1961 after a chair was not conferred on her husband despite his massive contributions; an ICT 1400 computer was donated to the Department of Numerical Automation but was in fact installed in the London School of Hygiene and Tropical Medicine.

In 1962, after leaving Birkbeck College the Booth family moved to Canada to where she became a Research Fellow, Lecturer and Associate Professor at the University of Saskatchewan until 1972. At Lakehead University in Canada she became the Professor of Mathematics from 1972 to 1978. Kathleen Booth retired from Lakehead in 1978. Her last current paper was published in 1993 at the age of 71. Titled "Using neural nets to identify marine mammals" it was co-authored by Dr. Ian J. M. Booth, her son.

Personal life and death
She died on 29 September 2022, at the age of 100.

Bibliography
 .
 .
 Booth A.D. and Britten K.H.V. (1947) Coding for A.R.C., Institute for Advanced Study, Princeton
 Booth A.D. and Britten K.H.V. (August 1947, 2nd Edition) General considerations in the design of an all-purpose electronic digital computer, Institute for Advance Study, Princeton
 Booth A.D. and Britten K.H.V. (1948) "The accuracy of atomic co-ordinates derived from Fourier series in X-ray crystallography Part V", Proc. Roy. Soc. Vol A 193 pp 305–310
 Booth A.D. and Booth K.H.V. (1953) Automatic Digital Calculators, Butterworth-Heinmann (Academic Press) London
 K.H.V Booth, (1958) Programming for an Automatic Digital Calculator, Butterworths, London

References

External links
The APEXC driver page
Principles and Progress in the Construction of High-Speed Digital Computers
Andrew Booth Collection, University of Manchester Library.
, Obituary in The Register.

1922 births
2022 deaths
20th-century British engineers
Alumni of the University of London
Academics of Birkbeck, University of London
British computer scientists
British mathematicians
Computer designers
History of computing in the United Kingdom
Academic staff of Lakehead University
People from Stourbridge
Programming language designers
Academic staff of the University of Saskatchewan
British women computer scientists
British women mathematicians
People from Worcestershire (before 1974)
British centenarians
Women centenarians
Women computer scientists